JetBlue Flight 292 was a scheduled flight from Bob Hope Airport in Burbank, California, to John F. Kennedy International Airport in New York City. On September 21, 2005, Captain Scott Burke executed an emergency landing in the Airbus A320-232 at Los Angeles International Airport after the nose gear jammed in an abnormal position. No one was injured.

Incident
Carrying 140 passengers and six crew, the Airbus A320-232 departed Burbank at 3:17 p.m. PDT (UTC−07:00). The aircraft, which was built in 2002, bore the tail number  and the name Canyon Blue. It was scheduled to fly  to John F. Kennedy International Airport.

After takeoff from Burbank, the pilots realized that they could not retract the landing gear. They then flew low over Long Beach Municipal Airport in Long Beach (the location of a JetBlue hub) to allow officials in the airport's control tower to assess the damage to its landing gear before attempting a landing. It was found that the nosewheel was rotated ninety degrees to the left, perpendicular to the direction of the fuselage.

Rather than land at Long Beach Airport, the pilot-in-command made the decision that the aircraft would land at Los Angeles International Airport (LAX), in order to take advantage of its long, wide runways and modern safety equipment.

This also served to lighten the plane, reducing potential stress on the landing gear and dramatically lowering landing speed as well. The Airbus A320 does not have the mechanical ability to dump fuel, despite various news agencies reporting that the aircraft was doing so over the ocean.

Because JetBlue planes are equipped with DirecTV satellite television, passengers on Flight 292 were able to watch live news coverage of their flight while the plane circled over the Pacific for hours. The in-flight video system was turned off "well before landing." Actress Taryn Manning was on the flight on her way to New York to promote the film Hustle & Flow. Screenwriter Zach Dean was also on the plane and, while contemplating his mortality, resolved to write a script about mortality, which eventually became the film Deadfall.

Emergency services and fire engines were standing by on the LAX ramp ahead of the landing. Although foam trucks were available, they were not used. The U.S. FAA no longer recommends pre-foaming runways, chiefly due to concerns that it would deplete firefighting foam supplies which might later be needed to respond to a fire; it is also difficult to determine exactly where a runway should be foamed, and pre-foaming might also reduce the effectiveness of the aircraft's brakes, potentially causing it to slide off the runway.

The plane landed on runway 25L. The nose gear generated sparks and flames when it touched down, but the plane was otherwise undamaged. To keep the nose gear off the ground as long as possible, reverse thrust was not used to slow the aircraft. As a result, the plane took longer than usual to decelerate, coming to a stop at 6:20 p.m. just  before the end of the  runway. Los Angeles Fire Dept. Battalion Chief Lou Roupoli said, "The pilot did an outstanding job. He kept the plane on its rear tires as long as he could before he brought [the nose gear down]".

Aftermath and evaluation 

Passengers began to disembark less than seven minutes later. The landing was smooth and no physical injuries were reported. The aircraft was evacuated via an airport stairs vehicle, as opposed to evacuation slides typically used in an emergency situation.

As JetBlue did not operate from LAX at the time, the aircraft was towed to a Continental Airlines hangar at LAX for evaluation. Expert opinion expressed was that, despite the drama and live worldwide coverage, there was little real danger to the passengers or crew of Flight 292. The A320, like all modern airliners, is engineered to tolerate certain failures, and, if necessary, can be landed without the nose gear at all.

The NTSB report says that worn-out seals were to blame for the malfunction, and that the BSCU system contributed to the problem. The NTSB reported that Airbus had since upgraded the system to take care of the problem.

Following the incident, the aircraft was repaired and returned to service still bearing the name "Canyon Blue." The flight route designation for JetBlue's flights from Burbank to New York was changed from 292 to 358 (the other direction became 359).

Similar incidents 

The media reported that this was at least the seventh occurrence of an Airbus A320 series aircraft touching down with the landing gear locked ninety degrees out of position, and one of at least sixty-seven "nose wheel failures" on A319, A320 and A321 aircraft worldwide since 1989. Earlier incidents included another JetBlue flight bound for New York City, a United Airlines flight into Chicago, and an America West flight into Columbus, Ohio.

While some incidents were traced to faulty maintenance and denied as a design flaw by Airbus Industries, the manufacturer had issued maintenance advisories to A320 owners which were later mandated as Airworthiness Directives by American and French aviation authorities. Messier-Dowty, which manufactures nose gear assemblies for the A320, stated in an NTSB report in 2004 that part of the gear had been redesigned to prevent future problems, but at the time the redesign was awaiting approval. Mechanics familiar with this common fault usually replace or reprogram the Brake Steering Control Unit (BSCU) computer.

On March 6, 2021, Batik Air Flight 6803, also operated by an A320-214 from Sultan Thaha Syaifuddin Airport to Soekarno–Hatta International Airport, suffered an incident similar to Flight 292 in which the gear turned sideways. The plane returned to its base and all passengers and crew survived.

Similarly, on March 29, 2022, LATAM Flight 4292 was a scheduled flight from Medellín to Cartagena which was operated by another Airbus A320-214. The flight was climbing to its cruising altitude when the crew was alerted to a possible fault in the landing gear. The aircraft returned to Medellín for an emergency landing with its nose landing gear jammed horizontally; none of the 147 occupants aboard were injured.

References

External links 
NTSB Report
NTSB investigation docket
JetBlue Flight 292 Video of the landing (Archive)
Firsthand account by passenger Alexandra Jacobs

Aviation accidents and incidents caused by undercarriage malfunction
Aviation accidents and incidents in the United States in 2005
Accidents and incidents involving the Airbus A320
292
Airliner accidents and incidents in California
2005 in California
Los Angeles International Airport
September 2005 events in the United States